This is a list of the final 14 man squads named for the 1992 Cricket World Cup held in Australia and New Zealand which took place from 22 February 1992 to 25 March 1992.  The oldest player at the 1992 Cricket World Cup was John Traicos (44) of Zimbabwe while the youngest player was Zahid Fazal (18) of Pakistan.

Australia
Coach: : Bob Simpson

Source:

England
Coach:  Micky Stewart

India
Coach:  Abbas Ali Baig

New Zealand
Coach:  Warren Lees

Pakistan

Coach:  Intikhab Alam

South Africa
Coach: Mike Procter

Sri Lanka

West Indies
Coach:  Rohan Kanhai

Zimbabwe

References

External links
 1992 World Cup squads. Cricinfo.com.

Cricket World Cup squads
1992 Cricket World Cup